Isorhipis is a genus of beetles belonging to the family Eucnemidae.

The species of this genus are found in Europe, Japan and Northern America.

Species:
 Isorhipis foveata Hisamatsu, 1955 
 Isorhipis marmottani Bonvouloir, 1871

References

Eucnemidae
Elateroidea genera